Schrammeln is a 1944 German film directed by Géza von Bolváry.

Plot summary

Cast

Soundtrack 
 Hans Holt - "Wenn ich nur wüßt"
 Hans Holt and Hans Moser - "'s Herz von an echten Weana (Schrammel Walzer)"
 Marte Harell - "So wie ich bin, ist auch mein Wien"
 Marte Harell, Hans Holt, Fritz Imhoff, Hans Moser and Paul Hörbiger - "Wer no in Wien net war und Linz net kennt"
 Hans Holt - "Man ist einmal nur verliebt!"
 Fritz Imhoff, Hans Moser and Paul Hörbiger - "Der Nachwuchs"
 Marte Harell - "Man ist einmal nur verliebt!"
 Hans Holt, Paul Hörbiger, Hans Moser and Fritz Imhoff - "Wien bleibt Wien"

External links 

1944 films
1944 musical comedy films
1940s biographical films
German musical comedy films
German biographical films
Films of Nazi Germany
1940s German-language films
German black-and-white films
Films set in the 19th century
Films set in Vienna
Films about musical groups
Films directed by Géza von Bolváry
Films about composers
Biographical films about musicians
Films about classical music and musicians
1940s German films